Stanislaus Joseph Brzana (July 7, 1917 – March 1, 1997) was an American prelate of the Roman Catholic Church who served as the tenth bishop of the Diocese of Ogdensburg, New York from 1968 to 1993.

Biography
Stanislaus Brzana was born in Buffalo, New York, to Frank and Catherine (née Mikosz) Brzana. He studied at Christ the King Seminary at St. Bonaventure University, and was ordained to the priesthood on June 7, 1941. He then did missionary work at the Cattaraugus Reservation and during World War II served as a chaplain with the Ninth Armored Division, ministering to troops in the Battle of the Bulge. After returning to New York and doing pastoral work, he earned a Doctor of Sacred Theology from the Pontifical Gregorian University in Rome in 1953.

On May 24, 1964, Brzana was appointed Auxiliary Bishop of Buffalo and Titular Bishop of Cufruta by Pope Paul VI. He received his episcopal consecration on the following June 29 from Bishop James A. McNulty, with Bishops Celestine Damiano and James Johnston Navagh serving as co-consecrators.

When Thomas Andrew Donnellan was made Archbishop of Atlanta, Brzana was appointed as Bishop of Ogdensburg on October 22, 1968. During his tenure, he served on committees of the National Conference of Catholic Bishops and took part in deliberations of the Second Vatican Council. He also established several churches and education centers, and was active in regional civic and social activities, including caring for striking miners and their families. In addition to receiving a Caritas award from Catholic Charities, he was made an honorary Mohawk Indian chief in 1977.

After 25 years in Ogdensburg, Brzana resigned on November 11, 1993. He spent his retirement in his native Buffalo, and later died at St. Joseph Hospital in Cheektowaga, aged 79.

References

1917 births
1997 deaths
St. Bonaventure University alumni
Religious leaders from Buffalo, New York
Participants in the Second Vatican Council
World War II chaplains
United States Army chaplains
Roman Catholic bishops of Ogdensburg
20th-century Roman Catholic bishops in the United States